Events from the year 2013 in Syria.

Incumbents
President: Bashar al-Assad
Prime Minister: Wael Nader al-Halqi

Events
For events related to the Civil War, see Timeline of the Syrian Civil War (January–April 2013) and Timeline of the Syrian Civil War (May–December 2013)

February
 9 February - President of Syria Bashar al-Assad reshuffles his cabinet, appointing seven new ministers in a move analysts describe as an attempt to stabilize the country's economy.

March

 29 March - During a U.N. conference, Iran, North Korea and Syria block adoption of a United Nations treaty that would regulate the international arms trade, a proposal which required agreement from all 193 UN member states to be adopted at the conference. A spokesman for Kenya and other countries, including the U.S., then asked the treaty be brought before the General Assembly, where unanimity is not required.

April
 2 April - The United Nations General Assembly approves the first Arms Trade Treaty to regulate the multibillion-dollar global trade in conventional arms with 154 votes in favor, three member states – Iran, North Korea and Syria – against the decision, and 23 abstentions.

Births

Deaths
Slimane Hadj Abderrahmane
November 17 - Abdul Qader Saleh, commander of Al-Tawhid Brigade

See also
 Syrian civil war

References

 
2010s in Syria
Syria
Years of the 21st century in Syria
Syria